Salvia cyanotropha is a rare and little known perennial Salvia that is endemic to the Ocaña region and the Sierra Nevada de Santa Marta in Colombia. It is found in dryland gullies at  elevation.

Notes

cyanotropha
Endemic flora of Colombia